Armen Adamyan (born 14 October 1967) is an Armenian professional football coach and a former player.

Career

Club
As a player, he made his debut in the Soviet Second League in 1988 for FC Karabakh Stepanakert.

Coaching
On 4 September 2020, Adamyan replaced Abraham Khashmanyan as manager of FC Alashkert. At the end of the 2019–20 season Adamyan was replaced by Yegishe Melikyan as manager of Alashkert.

References

External links

Profile at armfootball.tripod.com

1967 births
Living people
People from Stepanakert
Soviet footballers
Armenian footballers
Armenian expatriate footballers
Association football midfielders
Armenia international footballers
FC Chernomorets Novorossiysk players
FC Salyut Belgorod players
Russian Premier League players
Armenian expatriate sportspeople in Russia
Expatriate footballers in Russia
Armenian football managers
FC Mika managers
Expatriate football managers in Russia
FC Slavyansk Slavyansk-na-Kubani players
FC Kristall Smolensk players
Soviet Armenians